Goliathia is an extinct genus of bird. The holotype is an ulna recovered from lower beds of the Jebel Qatrani Formation in Faiyum Governorate in Egypt. Initially thought to be a heron, an additional bone, a tarsometatarsus, showed this bird to be closely related to the living shoebill. Its full name is Goliathia andrewsii, but may be closely related enough to be classed within the same genus as the living species. The ancient habitat was likely a thickly vegetated freshwater swamp, with this species and a fossil jacana, as well as lungfish and catfish recovered from it. The same size as the living shoebill, it likely ate lungfish and catfish.

Sources

 The Origin and Evolution of Birds by Alan Feduccia, 

Oligocene birds of Africa
Fossil taxa described in 1930